Meczup is a debut solo album by Turkish jazz singer Can Bonomo.

Track listing 
 "Bana Bir Saz Verin" (4:07)
 "Balon" (3:07)
 "Opium" (3:13)
 "Hep Bi' Derdi Olur" (3:50)
 "Ayıl" (4:07)
 "Sebebi Var" (3:54)
 "Şaşkın" (2:59)
 "Ben Yağmurum" (2:46)
 "Süper" (4:47)
 "Meczup" (3:48)
 "Daha Sıcak Daha Dumanlı" (5:13)

References

External links 
 Last.fm album page

2011 debut albums